Saima Mohsin is a British Pakistani journalist and presenter born and raised in South London. Most recently she has been an international correspondent for CNN.

Career 

In 2000 Mohsin gained her first job in television joining ITV Meridian as a producer, and later became a presenter/reporter for the station. In 2002, Mohsin joined BBC Points West as a reporter and presenter. In 2004 she moved to BBC One's Watchdog - the UK's most watched current affairs show - as an investigative reporter on consumer issues.

Mohsin later worked freelance as a newsreader and reporter for BBC News 24, Sky News and ITN. She presented a debate show for Channel 4 on suicide bombings and the future of British Islam following the 7/7 London bombings.

In 2006 Mohsin joined GMTV on which she covered stories around the UK and the world including the plea to free Mirza Tahir Hussain from death row in Pakistan and Glaswegian runaway 12‑year-old Molly Campbell/Misba Rana.

She moved to Pakistan in 2007 to be the face of Dawn News, Pakistan's first English news channel. She presented News Eye, the channel's flagship nightly news programme. She contributes as a special correspondent for PBS NewsHour in the United States as well as ITN and Daybreak in the United Kingdom.

She was Pakistan Correspondent in 2013 and later an International Correspondent for CNN International until 2017.

References 

English people of Pakistani descent
Living people
1977 births
Alumni of the University of Birmingham
British expatriates in Pakistan
Dawn Media Group people
British women journalists